Paul Booth (registered second ¼ 1865 – registered third ¼ 1914) was an English rugby union footballer who played in the 1880s. He played at representative level for Yorkshire, and at club level for Wakefield Trinity (were a rugby union club at the time, so no Heritage № is allocated). Prior to Tuesday 27 August 1895, Wakefield Trinity was a rugby union club.

Background
Paul Booth's birth was registered in Wakefield district, West Riding of Yorkshire, and his death aged 49 was registered in Wakefield district, West Riding of Yorkshire.

Change of Code
When Wakefield Trinity converted from the rugby union code to the rugby league code on Tuesday 27 August 1895, Paul Booth would have been 30 years of age. Subsequently, he didn't become both a rugby union and rugby league footballer for Wakefield Trinity.

References

External links

Search for "Booth" at espnscrum.com
Search for "Booth" at rugbyleagueproject.org

1865 births
1914 deaths
English rugby union players
Rugby union players from Wakefield
Wakefield Trinity players
Yorkshire County RFU players